Events from the year 1852 in the United States.

Incumbents

Federal Government 
 President: Millard Fillmore (W-New York)
 Vice President: vacant
 Chief Justice: Roger B. Taney (Maryland)
 Speaker of the House of Representatives: Linn Boyd (D-Kentucky)
 Congress: 32nd

Events
 January 15 – Nine men representing various Hebrew charitable organizations come together to form what will become the Mount Sinai Hospital in New York City.
 February 16 – The Studebaker Brothers Wagon Company, precursor of the automobile manufacturer, is established.
 February 19 – The Phi Kappa Psi fraternity is founded at Jefferson College in Canonsburg, Pennsylvania.
 March 2 – The first American experimental steam fire engine is tested.
 March 4 – The Phi Mu fraternity is established at Wesleyan College. 
 March 20 – Uncle Tom's Cabin by Harriet Beecher Stowe is first published in book form, in Boston.
 April 23 – More than 150 Wintu people are killed by a militia under the guidance of Trinity County sheriff William H. Dixon in the Bridge Gulch Massacre.
 July 1 – American statesman Henry Clay is the first to receive the honor of lying in state in the United States Capitol rotunda.
 July 5 – Frederick Douglass delivers his famous speech on "The Hypocrisy of American Slavery" in Rochester, New York.
 August 3 – The first Boat Race between Yale and Harvard, the first American intercollegiate athletic event, is held.
 September 15 – Loyola College opens its doors to students in the City of Baltimore, Maryland.
 November 2 – U.S. presidential election, 1852: Democrat Franklin Pierce of New Hampshire defeats Whig Winfield Scott of New Jersey.
 November 25 – Monticello Convention: 44 people from the northern parts of Oregon Territory meet and draft a petition to establish a separate territorial government north of the Columbia River (which becomes, in the following months, Washington Territory).

Undated
 In Hawaii sugar planters bring over the first Chinese laborers on 3 or 5 year contracts, giving them 3 dollars per month plus room and board for working a 12-hour day, 6 days a week.
 Loyola College in Maryland is chartered in Baltimore.
 Tufts University is founded in Medford, Massachusetts.
 Mills College is founded as the Young Ladies Seminary in Benicia, California.
 Justin Perkins, an American Presbyterian missionary, produces the first translation of the Bible in Assyrian Neo-Aramaic, which is published with the parallel text of the Syriac Peshitta by the American Bible Society.
 Lowell, Indiana is incorporated
 Westminster College, a Presbyterian Liberal Arts School, is founded New Wilmington, PA.

Ongoing
 California Gold Rush (1848–1855)

Births
 January 8 – James Milton Carroll, Baptist pastor, leader, historian and author (died 1931)
 January 11 – Elnora Monroe Babcock, suffragist (died 1934)
 January 14 – Cornelia Cole Fairbanks, wife of Charles W. Fairbanks, Second Lady of the United States (died 1913)
 February 16 – Charles Taze Russell, Christian restorationist minister (died 1916)
 February 18 – Ferdinand Lee Barnett, African American journalist, lawyer and civil rights activist (died 1936)
 February 26 – John Harvey Kellogg, Adventist doctor and health reformer (died 1943)
 March 25 – Charles Loomis Dana, neurologist (died 1935)
 April 1 – Edwin Austin Abbey, painter and illustrator (died 1911)
 April 13 – F. W. Woolworth, merchant and businessman (died 1919)
 April 23 – Edwin Markham, poet (died 1940)
 May 1 – Calamity Jane, frontierswoman (died 1903)
 May 11 – Charles W. Fairbanks, 26th Vice President of the United States from 1905 till 1909 and United States Senator from Indiana from 1897 to 1905 (died 1918)
 May 14 – Alton B. Parker, judge and Democratic political candidate (died 1926)
 May 18 – Gertrude Käsebier, née Stanton, one of the most influential American portrait photographers of the early 20th century (died 1934)
 May 23 – Weldon B. Heyburn, U.S. Senator from Idaho from 1903 to 1912 (died 1912)
 June 22 – Mary Canfield Ballard, poet and hymnwriter (died 1927)
 July 4
John H. Hill, African American lawyer and educator (died 1936)
Loretta C. Van Hook, Presbyterian missionary and educator (died 1935)
 August 16 – Charles Sanger Mellen, railroad manager (died 1927)
 September 15 – Edward Bouchet, African American physicist (died 1918)
 October 25 – Byron Andrews, journalist, statesman, author and businessman (died 1910)
 October 30 – Jane Kelley Adams, educator (died 1924)
 October 31 – Mary Eleanor Wilkins Freeman, short-story and children's fiction writer and poet (died 1930)
 November 1 – Eugene W. Chafin, politician (died 1920)
 November 10 – Henry van Dyke, author, poet, educator and clergyman (died 1933)
 November 15 – Ella Maria Ballou, writer (d. 1937)
 November 16 – Joseph R. Burton, U.S. Senator from Kansas from 1901 to 1906 (died 1923)

Deaths
 February 14 – Thomas Carlin, 7th Governor of Illinois from 1838 to 1842 (born 1789)
 February 24 – John Frazee, first American-born sculptor to execute a bust in marble (born 1790)
 March 9 – Anson Dickinson, painter of miniature portraits (born 1779)
 April 10 – John Howard Payne, actor, playwright, author and consul in Tunis from 1842, lyricist for "Home! Sweet Home!" (born 1791)
 May 6 – William Bellinger Bulloch, U.S. Senator from Georgia in 1813 (born 1777)
 May 15 – Louisa Adams, First Lady of the United States as wife of John Quincy Adams from 1825 to 1829 (born 1775)
 May 18 – Briscoe Baldwin, planter and Virginia politician (born 1789)
 June 8 – Perry Smith, U.S. Senator from Connecticut from 1837 to 1843 (born 1783)
 June 17 – William King, merchant, shipbuilder, army officer and statesman (born 1768)
 June 29 – Henry Clay, U.S. Senator from Kentucky 1806-1807, 1810-1811, 1831-1842 and 1849-1852 (born 1777)
 July 19 – John McKinley, U.S. Senator from Alabama from 1826 to 1831 and in 1837, Associate Justice of the U.S. Supreme Court from 1837 to 1852 (born 1780)
 August 14 – Margaret Taylor, First Lady of the United States as wife of Zachary Taylor (born 1788)
 September 20 – Philander Chase, Episcopal Church bishop, educator, pioneer of the western frontier and founder of Kenyon College (born 1775)
 September 23 – John Vanderlyn, neoclassical painter (born 1775)
 October 4 – James Whitcomb, U.S. Senator from Indiana from 1849 to 1852 (born 1795)
 October 13 – John Lloyd Stephens, traveler, diplomat and Mayanist archaeologist (born 1805)
 October 24 – Daniel Webster, U.S. Senator from Massachusetts (born 1782)
 October 25 – John C. Clark, politician (born 1793)
 November 18 – John Andrew Shulze, politician (born 1775)
 November 24 – Walter Forward, lawyer and politician, 15th U.S. Secretary of the Treasury from 1841 to 1843 (born 1786)
 November 30 – Junius Brutus Booth, actor, father of John Wilkes Booth and Edwin Booth (born 1796 in England)
 December 13 – Frances Wright, freethinker (born 1795 in Scotland)
 December 18 – Horatio Greenough, sculptor (born 1805)

See also
Timeline of United States history (1820–1859)

References

External links
 

 
1850s in the United States
United States
United States
Years of the 19th century in the United States